Wayside is a small unincorporated community in Armstrong County, Texas, United States. In 2000, the population was thirty-five. The community is part of the Amarillo, Texas Metropolitan Statistical Area.

History
Wayside was originally named Beulah, after the daughter of one of the McSpadden family's daughters. It was renamed Wayside for its location on the "wayside" of the Palo Duro Canyon. A post office was established at Wayside in September 1897 with Hervey J. Bradford as postmistress. The community's first settlers were cowboys on the JA Ranch who developed line camps along the canyon's south rim. A road was also built to move cattle and ranch outfits across the canyon to the community. It was a retail supply point for an area that was perfect for livestock raising and irrigated farming. It had two stores and 40 residents in 1940. The Texas Department of Transportation found another business, as well as a cemetery in Wayside in 1948. It had the same three businesses, as well as a population of 100, in 1967, which declined to 36 two years later. It was 40 in 1970 through 1990. It had one business in 1991 and Native American relics from the 15th century were found near Wayside. Its population was 35 in 2000. Its population was estimated as 40 in 2010.

Although it is unincorporated, Wayside has a post office, with the ZIP Code of 79094.

Geography

Education
Wayside was first established as a school district in 1893. Its land was donated by the McSpadden family. It had its own high school in 1940, and another school in 1948. Today, the community is served by the Claude Independent School District.

References

Unincorporated communities in Armstrong County, Texas
Unincorporated communities in Texas
Unincorporated communities in Amarillo metropolitan area